The Australian national under-16 and under-17 basketball team is the junior boys' basketball side that represents Australia in international under-17 youth basketball competitions. The team is governed by the Australian Basketball Federation Inc. Their greatest accomplishments were finishing as silver medalists at two FIBA Under-17 World Cups.

Competitive record

World Cup

Head coaches
 Mark Watkins 
  Mark Radford - 2019–present

See also

 Australia men's national basketball team
 Australia women's national basketball team
 Australia men's national wheelchair basketball team
 Australia women's national wheelchair basketball team
 Australia national under-19 basketball team
 Australia women's national under-19 basketball team

References

External links

Men's national under-17 basketball teams
National youth sports teams of Australia